Dudhaunda railway station (DDNA) is a passenger rail station serving the village of Patrahi and nearby villages like Bisauri, Kopa It is situated  from Jaunpur Junction.This station is situated at Saidpur–Khajurhat road, where people can get easily trains for such cities. It is a very famous and small station of this area.

Outline
Dudhaunda is one of the railway stations on the Aunrihar–Jaunpur line section. The station falls under the administration of Varanasi division,  North Eastern Railway zone.

History

This station Dudhaunda was made on 21 March 1904 when Aunrihar–Kerakat–Jaunpur line was opened under the administration of Bengal and North Western Railway.

Trains
 GONDIA–BJU EXPRESS
 JNU–ARJ PASSENGER
 ARJ–JNU PASSENGER
 GCT–BSB DMU
 BSB–GCT DMU

See also
Bengal and North Western Railway
North Eastern Railway zone
Oudh and Tirhut Railway

References

External links
Dudhaunda at Indiarailinfo

Railway stations in Jaunpur district
Railway Stations in Kerakat Sub District
Railway stations opened in 1904
1904 establishments in India
Varanasi railway division